... Gdziekolwiek jesteś Panie Prezydencie is a Polish historical film. It was released in 1978.

Cast 

Tadeusz Łomnicki as Stefan Starzyński
Jacek Recknitz as Journalist from USA
 Henryk Czyż as Deputy of Stefan Starzyński
 Wanda Elbińska as Secretary of Stefan Starzyński
 Rudolf Gołębiowski as Mieczysław Niedziałkowski
 Józef Konieczny as Deputy of Stefan Starzyński
 Halina Łabonarska as Maid of Stefan Starzyński
Władysław Kozłowski as Deputy of Stefan Starzyński
Andrzej Polkowski as Doctor and friend of Stefan Starzyński
Ryszard Sobolewski as General Rommel
Tadeusz Bogucki as Marian Kościałkowski
Aleksander Fabisiak as Officer

References

External links

1978 films
Polish historical films
1970s Polish-language films
1970s historical films